Lisa Theresa Hauser (born 16 December 1993) is an Austrian biathlete. She competed at the Biathlon World Championships 2013, and at the 2014 Winter Olympics in Sochi, sprint, pursuit and individual. She reached her first individual podium in the 2020–21 season in the Stage 5 sprint competition in Oberhof, finishing 3rd, and won the women’s Mass Start at the Biathlon World Championships 2021.

Biathlon results 
All results are sourced from the International Biathlon Union.

Olympic Games

World Championships
4 medals (1 gold, 3 silver)

World Cup

World Cup Podiums
World Championship podiums highlighted in green.

Individual Podiums

Team Podiums

Junior World Championships

References

External links

1993 births
Living people
People from Kitzbühel
Biathletes at the 2014 Winter Olympics
Biathletes at the 2018 Winter Olympics
Biathletes at the 2022 Winter Olympics
Austrian female biathletes
Olympic biathletes of Austria
Biathlon World Championships medalists
Sportspeople from Tyrol (state)
21st-century Austrian women